Devika Rotawan is a survivor of the 2008 Mumbai attacks (also referred to as 26/11) and a key witness who identified  Ajmal Kasab during trial as a perpetrator of the attack. She was 9 years old when she was shot in the leg during the attack in the Chhatrapati Shivaji Terminus, Mumbai.

Early life and education
Devika Rotawan was born to Sarika and Natwarlal Rotawan and has two brothers. Her mother died in 2006. Her father sold dried fruit before the 2008 Mumbai attacks.

After the attack, she and her family moved to Rajasthan, where her father is from and has family, then returned to Mumbai for the trial, and moved to a Bandra slum in 2009.

When she attempted to attend school after the 2008 Mumbai attacks, she was teased and shunned by her classmates. She began school at age 11, but had at first encountered resistance to her enrollment due to security concerns. She graduated from IES New English High School, Bandra east, completed HSC from Siddharth College, Fort, and attended Chetana College.

2008 Mumbai attacks

Rotawan was nine years old when she was injured in the 2008 Mumbai attacks. On 26 November 2008, she was waiting for a train with her father and brother when the attack started, and she was shot in her leg. After the attack, she had six surgeries and spent 65 days in the hospital. She lost the use of her right leg during her treatment and recuperation.

She was the youngest witness in the trial against Ajmal Kasab. She was recuperating from her injuries while also preparing for the trial in meetings with lawyers and depositions. On 10 June 2009, during her trial testimony, she identified Kasab as an attacker in the train station, and her father also testified.

Post-attack life
After the attacks, her family received compensation from the government and financial support from politicians and organizations, and spent much of the money on the medical care for her brother Jayesh. She has said additional compensation later went to her own medical treatment.

She has said she wants to become an IPS officer. In 2019, she shared her story with the website Humans of Bombay. In 2020, she said she still had not received the home she had been promised by the government, and Maharashtra MLA Zeeshan Siddique advocated to Chief Minister Uddhav Thackeray for the home to be provided to her. In October 2020, after she filed a petition in court seeking the home from the government and asserted her family was unable to pay rent on their chawl in Bandra, the Bombay High Court ordered Chief Secretary Sanjay Kumar to consider it.

Honours and awards
In 2009, she was honoured with an award from a NGO. She also received the Nagrik Ratan award in Rajasthan from Banwari Lal Joshi. In 2014, she was awarded a Women Achievers Award, Rajasthan Gaurav Award, Shree Ganganagar Rajasthan Award from Tapovan trust, and the Baramati Award from Ajit Pawar and Sharad Pawar.

References

External links
 I had never seen a terrorist before, says 10-yr-old Rotawan (NDTV, YouTube, 26 November 2009)
 26/11 Stories Of Strength: Devika Rotawan (The Indian Express, YouTube, 30 November 2016)
 Mumbai 26/11 attacks: The story of the youngest witness : Mid Day (Mid-Day, YouTube, 25 November 2018)
 26/11 Survivor Devika Rotawan Speaks to Malishka (Red FM India, YouTube, 26 November 2018)
Devika Rotawan on Instagram

People from Mumbai
Survivors of the 2008 Mumbai attacks
Living people
Year of birth missing (living people)